Marissa Sue Prado (better known simply as Sue Prado) (born May 18, 1981) is a Filipino actress who is best known for her performances in Philippine New Wave films such as the 2013 film, Oro and Barber's Tales, among other roles on Philippine film, television, and theater.

Filmography

Online series

Television series

Film 
 Abadeha Neo-Ethnic Rock Cinderella (2007) - Abadeha (credited as Marissa Sue Prado)
 No Way Out (2008) - Gina
 Manila Skies (2009)
 Thelma (2011) - Marie
 Corazon: Ang Unang Aswang (2012) - Concha
 Barber's Tales (2013) - Rosa
 Rainbow's Sunset (2018)
 Aurora (2018)
 Dagsin (2019)

References

External links 

20th-century Filipino actresses
Filipino film actresses
Living people
Place of birth missing (living people)
University of the Philippines Los Baños alumni
GMA Network personalities
ABS-CBN personalities
1976 births